Molly Donahue is an American educator and politician serving as a member of the Iowa Senate from the 37th District. She previously served as a member of the Iowa House of Representatives from the 68th district from 2019 to 2023, when she was elected to the Senate.

Background 
Donahue was born and raised in Cedar Rapids, Iowa, where she attended Washington High School. She earned a Bachelor of Science in elementary education and teaching from Iowa State University, followed by a Master of Education in secondary behavior disabilities from the University of Northern Iowa. For 28 years, Donahue has worked as a teacher at Washington High School. She was elected to the Iowa House of Representatives in 2018.

References 

Living people
Democratic Party members of the Iowa House of Representatives
Educators from Iowa
American women educators
People from Cedar Rapids, Iowa
Iowa State University alumni
University of Northern Iowa alumni
Women state legislators in Iowa
Year of birth missing (living people)
21st-century American politicians
21st-century American women politicians